Paulo Henrique Dias da Cruz, or simply Paulinho Dias, (born 13 May 1988) is a Brazilian footballer who plays as a defensive midfielder for Aimoré.

Club career
A Cruzeiro youth graduate, Dias made his first-team – and Série A – debut on 12 May 2007, in a 2–2 away draw against Fluminense. He was subsequently loaned to Ipatinga, and joined Marília in 2009, after his link with Cruzeiro expired. After stints at Joinville, Guaratinguetá and Veranópolis, Dias moved to Chapecoense in the 2012 summer. He enjoyed two subsequent promotions with the club, being a starter in the vast majority of his spell. On 3 January 2014, Dias signed for Atlético Paranaense.

On 28 July 2017, Paulinho Dias joined Indian Super League side Delhi Dynamos.

Honours
Cruzeiro
Copa São Paulo de Juniores: 2007

References

External links

Paulinho Dias at playmakerstats.com (English version of ogol.com.br and zerozero.pt)

1988 births
Living people
Footballers from Belo Horizonte
Brazilian footballers
Association football midfielders
Campeonato Brasileiro Série A players
Campeonato Brasileiro Série B players
Indian Super League players
Cruzeiro Esporte Clube players
Marília Atlético Clube players
Joinville Esporte Clube players
Guaratinguetá Futebol players
Associação Chapecoense de Futebol players
Club Athletico Paranaense players
Esporte Clube Bahia players
Odisha FC players